Butte City may refer to:
Butte City, California
Butte City, Idaho
An early name for Butte, Montana